New Middletown is a village in southeastern Mahoning County, Ohio, United States. The population was 1,507 at the 2020 census. It is part of the Youngstown–Warren metropolitan area.

History
In 1825, New Middletown was founded by Samuel Moore and became an incorporated town in 1972. The village was most likely named after Middletown, Pennsylvania, the former home of a share of the first settlers.

Geography
New Middletown is located at  (40.965443, -80.558307).

Demographics

2010 census
As of the census of 2010, there were 1,621 people, 707 households, and 492 families living in the village. The racial makeup of the village was 98.8% White, 0.1% African American, 0.1% Asian, 0.4% from other races, and 0.6% from two or more races. Hispanic or Latino of any race were 1.7% of the population.

There were 707 households, of which 26.9% had children under the age of 18 living with them, 51.1% were married couples living together, 14.0% had a female householder with no husband present, 4.5% had a male householder with no wife present, and 30.4% were non-families. 28.0% of all households were made up of individuals, and 16% had someone living alone who was 65 years of age or older. The average household size was 2.29 and the average family size was 2.77.

The median age in the village was 47 years. 19.6% of residents were under the age of 18; 7.2% were between the ages of 18 and 24; 20.3% were from 25 to 44; 31.9% were from 45 to 64; and 21.3% were 65 years of age or older. The gender makeup of the village was 45.0% male and 55.0% female.

2000 census
As of the census of 2000, there were 1,682 people, 690 households, and 503 families living in the village. The population density was 1,932.0 people per square mile (746.5/km2). There were 727 housing units at an average density of 835.1 per square mile (322.6/km2). The racial makeup of the village was 99.29% White, 0.06% African American, 0.12% Native American, and 0.54% from two or more races. Hispanic or Latino of any race were 0.77% of the population.

There were 690 households, out of which 28.7% had children under the age of 18 living with them, 58.3% were married couples living together, 12.2% had a female householder with no husband present, and 27.1% were non-families. 25.1% of all households were made up of individuals, and 12.0% had someone living alone who was 65 years of age or older. The average household size was 2.44 and the average family size was 2.92.

In the village, the population was spread out, with 22.2% under the age of 18, 7.7% from 18 to 24, 25.7% from 25 to 44, 27.6% from 45 to 64, and 16.8% who were 65 years of age or older. The median age was 41 years. For every 100 females there were 84.4 males. For every 100 females age 18 and over, there were 83.6 males.

The median income for a household in the village was $35,139, and the median income for a family was $42,500. Males had a median income of $37,125 versus $21,563 for females. The per capita income for the village was $19,741. About 6.5% of families and 7.7% of the population were below the poverty line, including 10.2% of those under age 18 and 12.1% of those age 65 or over.

Education
Children in New Middletown are served by the Springfield Local School District. The current schools serving the village are:
Springfield Local Elementary School – grades K-4
Springfield Local Intermediate School – grades 5-8
Springfield Local High School – grades 9-12

The village is served by a branch of the Public Library of Youngstown and Mahoning County.

References

External links
Village website

Villages in Mahoning County, Ohio
Villages in Ohio
1825 establishments in Ohio
Populated places established in 1825